St Joseph's Church, is a Roman Catholic church in Cardiff, Wales. It is administered by the Rosminians. It serves the areas of Gabalfa, Cathays, and Maindy.

History

Early history 
The Rosminians arrived in Cardiff in 1854. They first established St Peter's Church, Roath, and St Alban's Church, Splott. The first church building of St Joseph's used parts from an iron church at St Alban's parish, which received a new building in 1911. This opened on shrubland in Gabalfa on 1 June 1913, served by priests from St Peter's parish. In 1921, it became an independent parish, serving around 1,000 Catholics. The presbytery building was completed later, in 1927.

The current church building received funding in 1934 from an £11,000 donation from Thomas Callaghan after the death of his wife Edith. It was designed by the architect F. R. Bates, with rounded arches and red-brown brick construction. This opened on 28 October 1936. It has a baptistery, bell tower, choir loft, and aisled nave.

Modern history 
The interior of St Joseph's Church was changed significantly after the Second Vatican Council. The church hall was added in the late 2000s.

Music

Organ 
The organ at St Joseph's was built in 1947 by Conacher and Co, with six ranks of pipes. This organ remained in the church until 2008, when water damage meant that the organ was scrapped. It was replaced with an electric organ in 2008.

References

External links 

Parish Website

Churches completed in 1936
Roman Catholic churches in Cardiff
Rosminian churches in the United Kingdom
Romanesque Revival church buildings in the United Kingdom